Tuckerton is an unincorporated community in Muhlenberg Township in Berks County, Pennsylvania, United States. Tuckerton is located at the intersection of Pennsylvania Route 61 and Tuckerton Road south of an interchange with U.S. Route 222.

References

Unincorporated communities in Berks County, Pennsylvania
Unincorporated communities in Pennsylvania